The Hazlitt Theatre is the main theatre in Maidstone, Kent. It was named after William Hazlitt, the famous essayist, who was born in Maidstone in 1778. It opened in 1955. It presents a varied programme of professional drama, comedy, music etc. as well as local community theatre groups.  This traditional proscenium arch theatre seats 353.  The sister venue, The Exchange, is a multi-purpose venue suiting a variety of events from theatre or dancing to conferences.

Hazlitt Youth Theatre
The Hazlitt Theatre is home to the Hazlitt Youth Theatre (HYT), who have performed a string of hit shows including plays, musicals, new writing, partnership projects, touring shows and a whole lot more! HYT provides opportunities for young people aged between 6 and 18 to put on productions, and to go and see professional plays. Being in a theatre such as The Hazlitt allows members to gain experience of all areas of theatre, and many members go on to study theatre-related courses at universities around the country.
Some of the Youth Theatre's recent productions were The Baker's Wife the musical by Stephen Schwartz and Joseph Stein and 'The Lost Christmas' by Lawrence Mark Whyte.  All their productions are well received by the audiences.
The most recent musical performed by the Hazlitt Youth Theatre was 'Our House' in October 2013, and a performance of 'The Lion, The Witch and The Wardrobe' at Christmas of that year. These were again well received by the audience.
The Hazlitt Youth Theatre also write new plays which include - 'House of Horrors' 2011 a play that combined urban legends and ghost stories. Another piece called 'Intense' 2011, a comedy about a group of young people trapped inside three tents due to an alien invasion.

Regular Performers 
 The Marlin School Of Dance
 Prima Stage School of Performing Arts
Stage Theatre Society
 Maidstone Operatics
 Hilton Hall Dance Academy
 Willington Players
 European Arts Company
Maidstone Scout Gang Show
The Amanda Jayne Stage School

Other Maidstone theatres
Other theatres in Maidstone include:
 The Exchange Studio (previously known as The Corn Exchange)
 The Fourth Wall
 Whatman Park Riverstage
 Hermitage Millennium Amphitheatre

References

External links
 Hazlitt Arts Centre

Theatres in Kent
William Hazlitt
Buildings and structures in Maidstone
1955 establishments in England
Maidstone Borough Council